Jorge Hernández (born 8 November 2000) is a Mexican professional footballer who plays as a midfielder for Belgian Pro League club Mechelen.

Club career
Hernandez made his professional debut in a 1–1 draw with Orange County SC. He played 82 minutes before being replaced by Zico Bailey.

On September 19, 2019, Hernandez signed a professional contract with LA Galaxy II.

Personal life
At the age of 5 Hernandez moved to the United States and grew up in Riverside, California.

Honours
Individual
USL Championship All League First Team: 2021

References

External links
 
 

2000 births
Living people
Association football midfielders
American soccer players
American expatriate soccer players
Mexican footballers
LA Galaxy II players
K.V. Mechelen players
USL Championship players
Soccer players from Riverside, California
American sportspeople of Mexican descent
Expatriate footballers in Belgium
American expatriate sportspeople in Belgium
FC Chornomorets Odesa players
Expatriate footballers in Ukraine
American expatriate sportspeople in Ukraine